Sandro La Vignera  (born 27 July 1977 in Catania, Italy) is an Associate Professor of endocrinology, faculty of medicine at the University of Catania. He works at the University Hospital “Policlinico G. Rodolico” of Catania at the Operative Unit of Endocrinology. From 2017 present in the Top World Scientist ranking published by Plos Biology (best scientists in the world for scientific productivity).

Education 
La Vignera earned his M.D. in 2002 at the University of Catania, the postgraduate degree in endocrinology in 2007 and a Ph.D. in andrological science, human reproduction and biotechnologies in 2012.

Research and career 
La Vignera started his research career on reproductive endocrinology and male sexuality. Since 2012, he is assistant professor of endocrinology at the University Teaching Hospital “Policlinico-Vittorio Emanuele”, University of Catania. He is the senior researcher and professor of andrology and endocrinology at the University of Catania. He has also been awarded the National Scientific Qualification as full professor of endocrinology.

He authored over 300 publications in peer-reviewed journals on Pubmed. The research activity mainly focused on the endocrinological aspects of reproduction and human sexuality.

Awards and honors 
Professor Sandro La Vignera is a specialist in Endocrinology, PhD in Andrological Sciences. Holds current positions: Professor of Endocrinology at the University of Catania. National Scientific Qualification as Full Professor of Endocrinology (from September 2018). Awarded as Best Under 40 Researcher in 2017 by the Italian Society of Endocrinology. Included in the “Top Worldwide Scientists Database” in 2017, 2019, 2020 by Plos Biology. Board Member of the Master of Reproductive Biotechnology of the University of Catania. Delegate for the Sicilian Regional Health Department for continuing medical education. Academician of the European Academy of Andrology. Treasurer of the
Italian Society of Andrology and Medicine of Sexuality. Member of the Regional Executive Council of the Italian Society of Endocrinology. Member of the Editorial Board of : “Scientific Reports-Nature”, “Journal of Clinical Medicine”, “Annals of Translational Medicine”, “Androgens: Clinical Research and Therapeutics”, "Therapeutic Advances in Endocrinology and Metabolism",  “Frontiers in Endocrinology”. Author of over 300 publications in indexed journals on Pubmed. Research-lines: “Endocrinological aspects of Reproduction and Human Sexuality”.

Selected publications

Books and chapters

References

External links 
 
 Official website
 

Living people
University of Catania alumni
Italian endocrinologists
Academic staff of the University of Catania
1977 births